Pseudoclanis biokoensis is a moth of the  family Sphingidae. It is known from São Tomé and Príncipe.

References

Pseudoclanis
Moths described in 1991